Qona Christie (born 9 March 1999) is a New Zealand judoka. She competed in the Tunis and Algeria African Judo Open in early 2022 where she gained a bronze medal and a 5th placing respectively. 

Christie has been selected to represent New Zealand at the 2022 Commonwealth Games.

References 

1999 births
Living people
New Zealand female judoka
Judoka at the 2022 Commonwealth Games
Commonwealth Games competitors for New Zealand
21st-century New Zealand women